Charl Kenneth Langeveldt (born 17 December 1974) is a South African cricket coach and former cricketer who is currently a bowling coach with the South Africa national cricket team.

As a cricket player, he played all formats of the game. A right-arm fast-medium bowler, he played for South Africa between 2001 and 2010, primarily in One Day Internationals. He was the bowling coach for the national side.

Domestic career
Langeveldt was born at Stellenbosch in Cape Province and worked as a warder at the Drakenstein Correctional Centre before pursuing his career in cricket. In 2005, Langeveldt was Morecambe Cricket Club's professional player; he later returned to the Northern Premier League for the 2007 season with Netherfield Cricket Club.

In 2008, Langeveldt joined Derbyshire as a Kolpak player, before playing for Kent as an overseas player in the 2011 Friends Life t20. Langeveldt also played for the Bangalore Royal Challengers in the Indian Premier League (IPL).

International career
He made his Test debut in January 2005 against England at his home ground of Cape Town and took 5 for 46 in the first innings. His ODI debut came much earlier, in October 2001 against Kenya at Kimberley, where he took two wickets. He was rewarded with 4 for 21 in the following game at Newlands. Included in South Africa's 2003 World Cup squad, he played in only one game which was in the pool stage against Kenya.

In 2005, in the 3rd ODI against the West Indies at Barbados, he took a hat-trick in the last over as South Africa won the match by 1 run. He bowled Ian Bradshaw and Daren Powell before getting Corey Collymore LBW to seal the victory. It was the first ever ODI hat-trick by a South African.

In 2007 he played in his second Cricket World Cup and after taking 5/39 in their win against Sri Lanka he became just the third South African to take a World Cup 5 wicket haul, which was also the first 5 wicket haul of the 2007 World Cup.

In early 2008, Langeveldt was controversially selected in the Test team for tour of India, at the expense of the white paceman André Nel. This was widely believed to be due to an order from Cricket South Africa to select more non-white players in the team as part of its transformation policy, rather than performance. Langeveldt declined his selection, citing the controversy over the selection.

Coaching career
Langeveldt has had two spells as South Africa's bowling coach. The first ran from June 2015 to October 2017, when Ottis Gibson took over the role. Langeveldt was appointed as the bowling coach of Bangladesh national cricket team in July 2019, but moved back to a coaching role with South Africa in December 2019.

See also
 List of South Africa cricketers who have taken five-wicket hauls on Test debut

References

External links
 

1974 births
Living people
Cape Coloureds
Basnahira Cricket Dundee cricketers
Boland cricketers
Border cricketers
Cricketers at the 2003 Cricket World Cup
Cricketers at the 2007 Cricket World Cup
Derbyshire cricketers
Kent cricketers
Leicestershire cricketers
Lions cricketers
One Day International hat-trick takers
Somerset cricketers
South Africa One Day International cricketers
South Africa Test cricketers
South Africa Twenty20 International cricketers
South African cricketers
South African prison officers
Cricketers who have taken five wickets on Test debut
South African cricket coaches
Royal Challengers Bangalore cricketers
Kolkata Knight Riders cricketers
People from Stellenbosch
Cricketers from the Western Cape